At least two ships of the Royal Norwegian Navy have been named HNoMS Trondheim, after the city of Trondheim:

, a  purchased from the Royal Navy in 1946 and broken up in 1961.
, an  commissioned in 1966 and decommissioned in 2006.

Royal Norwegian Navy ship names